Nixon Putt (born 3 March 1996) is a Papua New Guinean professional rugby league footballer who plays for the Central Queensland Capras in the Qld Cup and Papua New Guinea at international level. 

He previously played for the PNG Hunters and Norths Devils in the same competition. He has represented the PNG Kumuls at the international level, as part of the 2017 Rugby League World Cup. He made his international debut against the Cook Islands on May 7, 2017 in the Pacific Test at Campbelltown Sports Stadium, Sydney.

Background
Putt was born in Mount Hagen, Papua New Guinea.

2018
In 2018 at the end of year PNG Hunters awards presentation, he was awarded the Stan Joyce medal for the player of the year Award. In the same year he was signed by the Norths Devils for the 2019 Intrust Super Cup competition.

2019
Putt played in every game and was awarded the best forward for the Norths Devils in the end of year club awards presentation. He was also selected to represent  Papua New Guinea Kumuls for the inaugural Rugby League World Cup 9s to be hosted in Sydney Australia.

2022
In the final group stage game at the 2021 Rugby League World Cup, Putt scored two tries for Papua New Guinea in the 36-0 victory over Wales.

References

External links
2017 RLWC profile

1995 births
Living people
Central Queensland Capras players
Norths Devils players
Papua New Guinean rugby league players
Papua New Guinea Hunters players
Papua New Guinea national rugby league team players
Rugby league second-rows
People from the Western Highlands Province